Murtaza Razvi (17 December 1964 – 19 April 2012) was a senior Pakistani journalist with Dawn, Karachi.

Biography
Murtaza Razvi held master's degrees in Ancient Indian and Islamic History (University of the Punjab, Lahore) and Political Science & International Relations (Villanova University, Villanova, PA, USA).

Murtaza Razvi served as the Resident Editor of Dawn, Lahore (2005–2007), and columnist and political analyst of the Indian Express.

He was found murdered in Karachi on 19 April 2012. There were torture marks on his body, and his hands were tied.

Works
 Musharraf: the years in power (political biography of the former Pakistan President, General Pervez Musharraf; New Delhi, 2009, HarperCollins)
 Ordinary People (interviews with ordinary citizens of Pakistan about history, society, culture, etc.; Lahore, 1995, Progressive Publishers)

During his last days, he was working on the books Pittho's World & Other Stories (fiction, HarperCollins) and Pakistan Uncut (non-fiction, HarperCollins).

References

Pakistani male journalists
Dawn (newspaper) people
1964 births
2012 deaths
People murdered in Karachi
Assassinated Pakistani journalists
Pakistani torture victims
University of the Punjab alumni
Journalists from Lahore